The 2021 Rugby Europe Women's Sevens Trophy was held in Zagreb, Croatia and in Budapest, Hungary. The first leg of the tournament was in Zagreb and the second leg was in Budapest.

Schedule

Standings

References

Rugby Europe Sevens